Californium(III) bromide is an inorganic compound, a salt with a chemical formula CfBr3. Like in californium oxide (Cf2O3) and other californium halides, including californium(III) fluoride (CfF3), californium(III) chloride, and californium(III) iodide (CfI3), the californium atom has an oxidation state of +3.

Properties 
Californium(III) bromide is shown to crystallize in both the AlCl3 and FeCl3 type structures. In the former structure, the californium ion is six coordinated and the three independent Cf-Br bond lengths are 279.5±0.9 pm, 282.7±1.1 pm, and 282.8±0.8 pm.

Californium(III) bromide partially decomposes into californium(II) bromide under high temperature.

2 CfBr3 ->[\Delta T] 2 CfBr2 + Br2

In the radioactive decay of berkelium-249 to californium-249, the oxidation number and crystal structure are preserved. The six-coordinate berkelium(III) bromide (AlCl3-type monoclinic structure) decays to produce a six-coordinate californium(III) bromide, whereas an eight-coordinate berkelium(III) bromide (PuBr3-type, orthorhombic structure) produces an eight-coordinate californium(III) bromide.

See also 
 Californium
 Californium compounds

References 

Californium compounds